Gustav Arnold Grünvald (also Gustav/Gustaf Grünvaldt; 25 August 1888 Tartu – 1957 Uus-Meremaa ?) was an Estonian politician. He was a member of the Estonian Constituent Assembly, representing the Estonian Social Democratic Workers' Party. On 14 November 1919, he resigned his position and he was replaced by Jaan Pakk.

References

1888 births
Year of death missing
Politicians from Tartu
People from Kreis Dorpat
Estonian Social Democratic Workers' Party politicians
Members of the Estonian Constituent Assembly